Bryn Roy (born April 14, 1988 in Dalemead, Alberta) is a Canadian football linebacker who is currently a member of the Edmonton Eskimos. He was most recently a member of the Saskatchewan Roughriders of the Canadian Football League. He was drafted 34th overall by the Alouettes in the 2012 CFL Draft and was signed on May 24, 2012. He played college football with the Texas A&M–Commerce Lions.

Early life
Roy was born and raised in Dalemead, Alberta, the son of Mark and Audi Roy. His father was a World Champion Steer Wrestler. Bryn competed in the Team Roping as a teenager and young adult. However, he quickly transitioned into a football player where he was a three-year letterwinner at safety and wide receiver at Foothills Composite High School. He was named team MVP and regional MVP as a senior and was a three-time all-region selection and All-Province selection at safety. He was also voted the receiver of the year by opposing coaches in the league his senior season, recording 52 receptions and 8 touchdowns. Roy helped lead Foothills to the Provincial Championship as a junior and a League Championship in his junior and senior year. As senior he was a defensive captain and Most Valuable DB at the Alberta Senior Bowl.

Junior college
Roy moved to the United States and attended Snow College in Utah. He spent two seasons at Snow where he was Second team All-Conference selection as a sophomore after tallying 75 tackles, four sacks and a pair of fumble recoveries and notched a pair of sacks a forced fumble and two fumble recoveries in his first collegiate start. He helped lead the Badgers to back-to-back WSFL Conference championships.

Texas A&M Commerce
Roy transferred to Texas A&M-Commerce for his final two seasons where he was a starter as a Junior and was a key part of the Lions defense in 2011, capping off his collegiate career with a sack in each of his final four games. He was a Business Marketing major while in Commerce. He decided to forgo his senior season and was drafted by Montreal, selected with the 34th pick overall.

Professional career

Montreal Alouettes 
Roy was drafted by the Montreal Alouettes of the Canadian Football League in the 5th round (34th overall). Despite struggling with injuries in his first couple seasons in the league, Roy signed a two-year contract extension on January 6, 2015. He played in just 14 games over his four-year tenure with the Alouettes, still managing to notch up 14 Special Teams Tackles, leading the entire league for the month of October 2014 with 9. However, after spending more time on the injured list in 2015 due to an off season training injury, he was released on August 10, 2015.

Saskatchewan Roughriders 
Bryn signed with the Saskatchewan Roughriders on August 22, 2016. During the 2016 season Roy dressed for 9 games. He was released by the Roughriders on December 1, 2016.

References

External links
Montreal Alouettes bio

1988 births
Living people
Players of Canadian football from Alberta
Canadian football linebackers
Texas A&M–Commerce Lions football players
Montreal Alouettes players